A.R.E.S. Extinction Agenda is a 2.5D side-scrolling platform   shooter for Microsoft Windows. It was developed by a Thai independent developer Extend Studio.

Plot 
The game takes place in a future setting where the Earth is contaminated by pollution. A group of scientist were trapped in the Deep Space Reprocessing station after a mysterious asteroid emitting an unknown fluorescent gas collided into the station. The survivors then discovered that machines in the station became violent towards them after being exposed to the gas. Eventually, they managed to send the sample of the gas to the research team back at the United Earth Headquarters to find out a way to rescue them and called the gas Zytron. Player takes control of the game protagonist Ares, the first Zytron immune robot created to battle machines that became malevolent from being exposed to the Zytron gas, in a mission to rescue the survivors from a deep space station.

Gameplay
Players control Ares' movement with WASD keys on the keyboard and aim with a mouse. Ares can double jump and roll to avoid attacks and obstacles and can change his suit during the course of the game which gives him a different aesthetic appearance and abilities. He can also activate Vakyl Cannon, a rechargeable orbital cannon which destroys all of the enemies on screen. Players can collect parts from destroyed enemies to craft items and upgrade weapons. They can also collect Datacubes which are scattered throughout the stages which not only unlock background information about certain characters and enemies, but also improve Ares' abilities such as lowering the number of parts required to craft items. Throughout the game players are able to obtain new weapons in each stage. At the end of each stage, Ares will have to defeat bosses in order to progress. Players can go back between stages during the game by accessing the in-game menu.

Development
A.R.E.S. Extinction Agenda was originally called Trashman, but the development team changed the name to appeal more to international audiences.

Reception

The game reception is mostly average. Critics from major publications praised A.R.E.S. for its soundtrack and detailed vibrant artwork while criticizing the length of the game to be too short. Due to its popularity, the soundtrack of the game was eventually released on Steam as a downloadable content on January 2, 2012. A.R.E.S. won second prize in 2010 Microsoft's Dream.Build.Play. contest along with other notable independent games such as Beat Hazard.

References

External links
 

2010 video games
2013 video games
Indie video games
Microsoft XNA games
Science fiction video games
Side-scrolling video games
Platform games
Shooter video games
Video games about robots
Video games developed in Thailand
Video games with 2.5D graphics
Windows games
Xbox 360 Live Arcade games
Single-player video games